The  Military Ordinariate of Kenya  is a Latin Church ecclesiastical jurisdiction or military ordinariate of the Catholic Church. Immediately exempt to the Holy See, it provides pastoral care to Catholics serving in the Kenyan Armed Forces and their families.

History

When Kenya became independent in 1963, the Government of the Republic of Kenya adopted the British tradition of having Chaplaincy in the Kenya Defence Forces which is composed of the Kenya Army, the Kenya Air Force and the Kenya Navy.  The chaplaincy was entrusted with the responsibility of religious administration of the Kenya Defence Forces Personnel, their families and dependents. 

The Military Ordinariate of Kenya was established as a Military Vicariate on 20 January 1964 and Maurice Michael Cardinal Otunga was appointed the first Military Vicar on the same date.  On 24 July 1981, Pope John Paul II established the Military Vicariate in Kenya officially.  On 21 July 1986, Maurice Michael Cardinal Otunga became the first Ordinary of the Military Ordinariate of Kenya. 

Although the Military Vicariate existed since 20 January 1964, it was not registered with Government of Kenya till 15 December 1986 after its elevation to a Military Ordinariate on 21 July 1986. Maurice Michael Cardinal Otunga served the Military Ordinariate as an Ordinary up to 29 August 1997. Col (Rtd) Bishop Alfred Kipkoech Arap Rotich was appointed as the Military Ordinariate of Kenya Bishop on 29 August 1997 and served up to 30 December 2016.  Col Dr (Msgr) Benjamin K Maswili was appointed the Apostolic Administrator of the Military Ordinariate of Kenya on 30 December 2016.  

The Military Ordinariate has grown over the years from Vicariate to Ordinariate.  The number of Chaplains and Catechist has increased and thus spiritual and Pastoral care growth.

Office holders

Military Vicars
 Bishop Maurice Michael Otunga (appointed 20 January 1964 – became Military Ordinary 21 July 1986) (concurrent with this appointment, became Archbishop, later Cardinal); see below

Military Ordinaries
 Cardinal Maurice Michael Otunga (appointed 21 July 1986 – retired 29 August 1997); see above
 Alfred Kipkoech Arap Rotich (appointed 29 August 1997 - retired 30 December 2016)

Monsignor
 Msgr Benjamin Kituto Maswili (appointed Apostolic Administrator on 30 December 2016 - to date)

References
 Military Ordinariate - MIL (Kenya Episcopal Conference)
 Military Ordinariate of Kenya (Catholic-Hierarchy)
 Military Ordinariate of Kenya (GCatholic.org)

Roman Catholic dioceses in Kenya
Kenya
1964 establishments in Kenya
Military of Kenya